Emily LeSueur (born November 7, 1972 in Glendale, California) is an American competitor in synchronized swimming and Olympic champion.

She competed with the American team that received a gold medal in synchronized team at the 1996 Summer Olympics in Atlanta.

References

 

1972 births
Living people
American synchronized swimmers
Synchronized swimmers at the 1996 Summer Olympics
Olympic gold medalists for the United States in synchronized swimming
Sportspeople from Glendale, California
Olympic medalists in synchronized swimming
Medalists at the 1996 Summer Olympics